Pratt Rock, also known as Pratt's Rock, is a rockface or other landform that includes a series of stone carvings in Prattsville, New York depicting the life of Zadock Pratt. Pratt was supposed to be buried in a tomb carved into the stone, but work was stopped after only a  small recessed chamber was created because water leaked through the rock overhead, and excavating the stone was providing to be too difficult. The rock was originally a monument for Pratt's son, George W. Pratt, who was killed in the Civil War. It is considered the first memorial for the Civil War.

Ripley's Believe it or Not once called it "New York's Mt. Rushmore".

As Pratt Rock Park, the place was listed on the U.S. National Register of Historic Places in 1992.

References

External links

Pratt Rock, at RoadsideAmerica.Com includes photos
Pratt Rock Park history
Pratt Rock Photo Gallery

Prattsville, New York
Parks in Greene County, New York
Parks on the National Register of Historic Places in New York (state)
National Register of Historic Places in Greene County, New York